Gary Melvin Begg (born December 29, 1940) is a Canadian retired ice hockey centre and Olympian.

Begg played with Team Canada at the 1964 Winter Olympics held in Innsbruck, Austria.

Begg later became a "lawyer and engineer who developed real estate in Vancouver and Colorado, is now believed to be living aboard a yacht."

Awards and honors

References

External links

1940 births
Living people
Canadian ice hockey centres
Ice hockey people from Saskatchewan
Ice hockey players at the 1964 Winter Olympics
Michigan Tech Huskies men's ice hockey players
NCAA men's ice hockey national champions
Olympic ice hockey players of Canada
People from Moosomin, Saskatchewan
Toronto Marlboros players